Ampeauty is the fifth album of the Austrian death metal band Pungent Stench. It was originally released in 2004 on Nuclear Blast. The lyrical content is more fetish-oriented than on the previous albums, with many songs focusing on acrotomophilia and apotemnophilia.

Track listing
 "Lynndie (She-wolf of Abu-Ghraib)" – 6:55 (the song, its name similar to the film title Ilsa, She-Wolf of the SS, is presumably about Lynndie England)
 "Invisible Empire" – 5:59
 "The Amp Hymn" – 6:04
 "The Passion of Lucifer" – 4:49
 "Got MILF?" – 5:42
 "Human Garbage" – 5:51
 "Apotemnophiliac" – 4:06
 "No Guts, No Glory" – 5:04
 "Same Shit - Different Asshole" – 4:39
 "Fear the Grand Inquisitior" – 8:20

Personnel
 Martin Schirenc – vocals and guitar, production
 Testy – bass
 Alex Wank – drums

References

Pungent Stench albums
2004 albums
Nuclear Blast albums